James Scott may refer to:

Entertainment
 James Scott (composer) (1885–1938), African-American ragtime composer
 James Scott (director) (born 1941), British filmmaker
 James Scott (actor) (born 1979), British television actor
 James Scott (Shortland Street), character on the TV soap opera Shortland Street
 James Honeyman-Scott (1956–1982), British guitarist and member of The Pretenders

Military 
 James Scott (marine) (died 1796), Sergeant of Marines in the New South Wales Marine Corps
 James Scott (Royal Navy officer) (1790–1872), British naval officer
 James Bruce Scott (1892–1974), officer in the British Indian Army
 James Robinson Scott (died 1821), Scottish naval surgeon and noted amateur botanist
 James Stanley Scott (1889–1975), Royal Canadian Air Force officer

Politics

United Kingdom
 James Scott of Balwearie (died 1606), Scottish landowner and supporter of the rebel earls
 James Scott, Duke of Monmouth (1649–1685), noble recognized by some as James II of England
 James Scott, Earl of Dalkeith (1674–1705), English nobleman and politician
 James Scott (1671–1732), British MP, 1710–1711
 James Scott (British Army officer, died 1747) (c. 1672–1747), MP for Kincardineshire 1713–1734
 James Winter Scott (1799–1873), MP for North Hampshire, 1832–1837
 James Scott (Liberal politician) (1876–1939), British MP, 1929–1931
 Sir James Sibbald David Scott, 3rd Baronet (1814–1885), 3rd Scott baronets, of Dunninald
 Sir James Sibbald Scott, 1st Baronet (died 1819), 1st Scott baronets, of Dunninald

Elsewhere
 James Scott (Australian politician) (1810–1884), member of the Tasmanian House of Assembly
 Jim Scott (Australian politician) (James Alan Scott), Australian politician
 James Scott (American politician), Arizona State Senator
 James A. Scott (born 1942), member of the Florida Senate
 James F. Scott (West Virginia), delegate to the Second Wheeling Convention of 1861
 James Reid Scott (1839–1877), explorer and colonial administrator in the Australian colony of Tasmania
 James George Scott (1851–1935), colonial administrator in Burma
 James M. Scott (Canadian politician) (1860–1943), Canadian politician
 Jim Scott (Virginia politician) (James Martin Scott, 1938–2017), member of the Virginia House of Delegates

Sports 
 James Scott (basketball) (born 1972), American professional basketball player
 James Scott (cricketer), English cricketer
 James Scott (footballer, born 1881) (1881–?), Scottish footballer
 James Scott (footballer, born 1882) (1882–?), Scottish footballer
 James Scott (footballer, born 1895) (1895–1916), Scottish footballer
 James Scott (footballer, born 1905) (1905–?), Scottish footballer
 James Scott (footballer, born 2000), Scottish footballer for Motherwell
 James Melvin Scott (1911–2001), Senior Olympian, author, inventor
 James Scott (boxer) (1947–2018), American light heavyweight fighter
 James Scott (gridiron football) (born 1952), NFL wide receiver
 James Scott (rugby union) (born 1999), English rugby union player

Other
 James Scott (antiquarian) (1733–1818), minister in Perth and antiquarian
 James Brown Scott (1866–1943), American authority on international law
 James C. Scott (born 1936), political scientist and agrarian studies scholar
 James F. Scott (1942–2020), American physicist and FRAM pioneer
 James Hope-Scott (1812–1873), English barrister and Tractarian
 James Maurice Scott (1906–1986), British explorer and writer
 James Robb Scott (1882–1965), Scottish architect
 James Scott (cardiologist) (born 1946), British cardiologist
 James Scott (criminal) (born 1969), convicted of contributing to the Great Flood of 1993
 James Scott (obstetrician) (1924–2006), Scottish obstetrician and gynaecologist
 James Scott (police officer) (1899–1966), Irish police officer
 James Scott (political writer) (1733–1814), English cleric and academic, known for his "Anti-Sejanus" letters
 James Scott (priest) (died 1912), Irish Anglican priest
 James V. Scott, minister in the United Church of Canada
 James Scott (judge), American lawyer, judge, and politician from Indiana

See also
 Jim Scott (disambiguation)
 Jamie Scott (disambiguation)
 Jamie Scott (born 1984), British singer